The Ministry of Highways is divided into the Operations, Policy and Programs, and Corporate Services Divisions and the Communications Branch. The ministry is the employer of over 1,476 employees diversified amongst 105 communities in Saskatchewan. The current Minister of Highways and Infrastructure is Fred Bradshaw.

Operations Division 

The Operation Division has the responsibility of maintaining  of asphalt concrete pavements,  of granular pavements,  of thin membrane surface (TMS) highways,  of gravel highways,  of ice roads,  bridges,  large culverts, 12 ferries, one barge and 17 northern airports. Operational maintenance includes surface repair activities like crack filling, sealing, and patching; snow and ice control; pavement marking; signing; and ferry operations. Along with engineering, construction and design of the provincial road network, the operations division provides regulations, inspections and advice to the rural municipalities (R.M.) for the municipal road network.

Ferries 
All ferries in Saskatchewan are operated by the Government of Saskatchewan and, with the exception of the Wollaston Barge Ferry, are toll free. All are seasonal, with ferries generally operating from mid-April to mid-November, depending on ice conditions. The ferries operated include:
Cecil Ferry	
Clarkboro Ferry	
Estuary Ferry
Fenton Ferry	
Hague Ferry	
Lancer Ferry
Lemsford Ferry
Paynton Ferry	
Riverhurst Ferry
St. Laurent Ferry	
Weldon Ferry	
Wingard Ferry	
Wollaston Barge Ferry

History 

During the term of office for Eiling Kramer, 1972–1980, the Provincial Highway received extensive funding and paving for the entire system neared completion. Saskatchewan Highway 11 was restructured under the term of office of David Boldt, Minister 1966-1971. 	
John T. Douglas, during his term of office 1944-1960 established the Saskatchewan Transportation Company as a Crown Corporation of the government. Alan Carl Stewart, Minister of Highways 1929-1934, allocated $20 million for highway construction in Saskatchewan. George Spence, Minister of Highways 1927-1929, was responsible for the initiation of numbering Saskatchewan highways.

The first Board of Highways Commissioners was appointed by the provincial government in 1912, and the first Department of Highways was established in 1917. On September 1, 1934, the name was changed from the Department of Highways to the Department of Highways and Transportation.  Effective November 21, 2007 the Department of Highways and Transportation became the Ministry of Highways and Infrastructure.

Policy and Programs Division 
The Policy and Programs Division works with other legislative and regulatory agencies to ensure an optimal transportation network is provided via road, rail, air, and marine.

Corporate Services Division 
Corporate Services Division is responsible for the budgeting, finances, and forecasting for the needs of the Ministry of Highways and Infrastructure.

Communications Branch 
The Communications Branch of the Ministry of Highways and Infrastructure maintains the news releases, safety awareness and education programs.

Saskatchewan Highway Patrol 
The 14 detachments operate six border and seven interior weigh stations, three 24-hour self-weigh decks and one Mobile Vehicle Inspection Station. The head office regulates their operations in compliance with the Commercial Vehicle Safety Alliance and the Canadian Council Motor Transport Administrators. They are a member of the Saskatchewan Protection and Response Team (PRT) responsible for reducing rural crime throughout the province.

Area Transportation Planning Support Program
Area Transportation Planning (ATP) Support Program analyzes transportation in regional areas to provide funding for regional needs. Committees which comprise representatives from the local rural and urban municipalities, Regional Economic Development Authorities (REDA), Saskatchewan Urban Municipalities Association, Saskatchewan Association of Rural Municipalities, and Highways and Infrastructure analyze local needs and the effects of the increased use of grain via truck transportation and the decreased use of rail transport is having on road infrastructure.
There are currently 9 committees which comprise the majority of Saskatchewan except for an area near La Ronge and Southend.
Athabasica Basin Transportation Planning Committee
North North West Transportation Planning Committee
North North East Transportation Planning Committee
West Central Transportation Planning Committee
Central Transportation Planning Committee
North East Area Transportation Planning Committee
East Central Transportation Planning Committee
South East Transportation Planning Committee
South Central Transportation Planning Committee
Southwest Transportation Planning Committee

The Strategic Partnership Program 
The Strategic Partnership Program analyzes low traffic volume thin membrane surface highways working with rural municipalities and First Nation agencies to provide an effective and operational traffic flow between thin membrane surface highways and the provincial network.

Community Airport Partnership 

Community Airport Partnership (CAP) provides a mandate to the Ministry of Highways and Infrastructure to maintain and assist southern airport infrastructure.

Adopt-A-Highway Program
Groups or individuals may sponsor a  stretch of highway to pick up litter and maintain highway appearances.

Past ministers

Statistics

See also

Roads in Saskatchewan
List of Saskatchewan provincial highways
Numbered highways in Canada
Transportation in Saskatchewan

References

External links
Appendix A, Long-Term Pavement Performance Maintenance and Rehabilitation Data Collection Guide, FHWA-HRT-06-068 - LTPP - Pavements - FHWA
Saskatchewan’s Asset Management Cycle Authors: Josh Safronetz, M
Submission to the Canada Transportation Act Review Panel

Saskatchewan
Highways And Infrastructure
Transport in Saskatchewan
Saskatchewan, Highways And Infrastructure
Saskatchewan, Highways And Infrastructure
Transport organizations based in Canada